The Tyson Medal is a prize awarded for the best performance in subjects relating to astronomy at the University of Cambridge, England. It is awarded annually for achievement in the examinations for Part III of the Mathematical Tripos when there is a candidate deserving of the prize. In his will, Henry Tyson made the following bequest:

The value of the fund was £65,095 in 2008.

List of winners
Most of this list is from The Times newspaper archive. The winners of the prize are published in The Cambridge University Reporter.

See also

 List of astronomy awards
 List of mathematics awards

References

1895 establishments in England
Astronomy prizes
Astronomy-related lists
Awards established in 1895
Awards and prizes of the University of Cambridge
British science and technology awards
Lists of people associated with the University of Cambridge
Mathematics awards
Mathematics-related lists
Student awards